This is a list of notable footballers who have played for Shrewsbury Town. Generally, this means players that have played a significant amount of first-class matches for the club. Other players who have played an important role for the club can be included, but the reason why they have been included should be added in the 'Notes' column.

For a list of all Shrewsbury Town players, major or minor, with a Wikipedia article, see Category:Shrewsbury Town F.C. players, and for the current squad see the main Shrewsbury Town F.C. article.

Players with over 100 appearances for Shrewsbury Town
Total caps and goals are for all senior competitions (including substitute appearances) in the Football League, Football League play-offs, Football League Cup, FA Cup, Welsh Cup and Football League Trophy.

Updated 19 February 2018.

References

External links 

Players
 
Shrewsbury Town F.C.
Association football player non-biographical articles